The United Nations Economic Commission for Europe (ECE or UNECE) is one of the five regional commissions under the jurisdiction of the United Nations Economic and Social Council. It was established in order to promote economic cooperation and integration among its member states.

The commission is composed of 56 member states, most of which are based in Europe, as well as a few outside of Europe. Its transcontinental Eurasian or non-European member states include: Armenia, Azerbaijan, Canada, Cyprus, Georgia, Israel, Kazakhstan, Kyrgyzstan, the Russian Federation, Tajikistan, Turkey, Turkmenistan, the United States of America and Uzbekistan.

History 
The commission was established by the Economic and Social Council on 28 March 1947 in order to "Initiate and participate in measures for facilitating concerted action for the economic reconstruction of Europe," as well as to "maintain and strengthen the economic relations of the European countries, both among themselves and with other countries of the world."

It was established at the request of the United Nations General Assembly who called on the Economic and Social Council to create the commission, as well as the Commission for Asia and the Far East, in order to "give effective aid to countries devastated by war."

ECE absorbed the function and resources of the European Central Inland Transport Organization upon its founding.

As the commission was established towards the beginning of the Cold War, it faced difficulties in achieving its mandate of economic reconstruction of Europe due to the Iron Curtain: separately the Organisation for European Economic Co-operation was established in 1948 in the west and the Council for Mutual Economic Assistance in 1949 in the east. The work of the commission had to concern itself only with questions that were of common interest to East and West, as to not cause confrontation. However, since the fall of the Soviet Union, the economic commissions of the United Nations have been expanding their activities in the former Soviet republics.

Member states

The following are the member states of the commission, along with their date of admission:

Committees and programmes

Committee on Environmental Policy 
The concern of UNECE with problems of the environment dates back at least to 1971, when the group of Senior Advisors to the UNECE governments on environmental issues was created which led to the establishment of the Committee on Environmental Policy, which now meets annually. The Committee provides collective policy direction in the area of environment and sustainable development, prepares ministerial meetings, develops international environmental law and supports international initiatives in the region. CEP works to support countries to enhance their environmental governance and transboundary cooperation as well as strengthen implementation of the UNECE regional environmental commitments and advance sustainable development in the region.

Its main aim is to assess countries' efforts to reduce their overall pollution burden and manage their natural resources, to integrate environmental and socioeconomic policies, to strengthen cooperation with the international community, to harmonize environmental conditions and policies throughout the region and to stimulate greater involvement of the public and environmental discussions and decision-making.

CEP is the overall governing body of UNECE environmental activities. The Committee's work is based on several strategic pillars: 
 Providing the secretariat to the "Environment for Europe" process and participating in the regional promotion of Agenda 21; 
 Developing and carrying-out of UNECE Environmental Performance Reviews in the UNECE countries non-members of OECD;
 Overseeing UNECE activities on environmental monitoring, assessment and reporting;
 Increasing the overall effectiveness of UNECE multilateral environmental agreements (MEAs) and facilitating the exchange of experience on MEAs' implementation. See UNECE Espoo Convention, Aarhus Convention, Convention on Long-Range Transboundary Air Pollution, Convention on the Protection and Use of Transboundary Watercourses and International Lakes and Convention on the Transboundary Effects of Industrial Accidents.
 Participating and/or facilitating the exchange of experience in a number of cross-sectoral activities undertaken under the leadership of UNECE (e.g. education for sustainable development, transport, health and environment, green building), or in partnership with other organizations (e.g. environment and security initiative, European environment and health process).

Committee on Forests and the Forest Industry 
The first task of UNECE after the Second World War was to coordinate reconstruction effort in Europe. Timber was crucial for construction, and energy, but the forests had been heavily overcut and production and trade were at a standstill. The ECE Timber Committee emerged from the International Timber Conference held in 1947 in Mariánské Lázně in the former Czechoslovakia.

The main pillars of the Committee's activities have been: the collection and publication of the best available statistics on forests, wood production and trade; the exchange of information on forest working techniques and training of forest workers; periodic surveys of the long-term outlook on forests; technical work on the rational use of wood; reviewing forest product markets; and share experiences on forest and forest sector policy.

Committee on Urban Development, Housing and Land Management 
In 1947, UNECE set up a Panel on Housing Problems, which later evolved into the Committee on Human Settlements and after the reform in 2005/2006 into the Committee on Housing and Land Management. The Committee is an intergovernmental body of all UNECE member States. It provides a forum for the compilation, dissemination and exchange of information and experience on housing, urban development, and land administration policies; and in areas such as Birmingham, a more fiscal issue-UK.

In 2020, the CUDHLM created the Forum of Mayors at the Palais des Nations, an event allowing mayors from the UNECE region to exchange their best practices on urban development, housing and land management. UNECE is the first UN Regional Economic Commission to implement such an initiative that facilitates the cooperation between the UN, Member States and cities.

Inland Transport Committee 
The UNECE Transport Division has been providing secretariat services to the World Forum for Harmonization of Vehicle Regulations (WP.29).
In addition to acting as secretariat to the World Forum, the Vehicle Regulations and Transport Innovations section serves as the secretariat of the Administrative Committee for the coordination of work, and of the administrative/executives committees of the three agreements on vehicles administered by the World Forum.

Among other things, ITC has produced:
 59 United Nations conventions concerning inland transport,
 Trans-European North-South Motorways, Trans-European Railways and the Euro-Asia Transport Links projects
 the TIR system (Transports Internationaux Routiers), a global customs transit facilitation solution
 transport statistics methods.

The World Forum services three UN Agreements:
 the 1958 Agreement on the approval/certification of Vehicles and its annexed UN Regulations,
 the 1997 Agreement on Periodic Technical Inspections (PTI) and its annexed UN Rules,
 and the 1998 Agreement on Global Technical Regulations and its annexed UN GTRs.

Statistical Division 
The UNECE Statistical Division provides the secretariat for the Conference and its expert groups, and implements the statistical work programme of UNECE. The Conference brings together chief statisticians from national and international statistical organizations around the world, meaning that the word "European" in its name is no longer an accurate description of its geographical coverage. The Statistical Division helps member countries to strengthen their statistical systems, and coordinates international statistical activities in the UNECE region and beyond through the Conference and its Bureau, and the Database of International Statistical Activities. The Statistical Division develops guidelines and training materials on statistical methodology and practices, in response to demands from member countries. It works with different groups of specialists from national and international statistical organizations, and organizes meetings and online forums for statistical experts to exchange experiences on a wide range of topics. The UNECE Statistical Division also provides technical assistance to South-East European, East European, Caucasus and Central Asian countries.

The division also provides:

 On-line data on the 56 UNECE member countries in Europe, Central Asia and North America in both English and Russian, on economic, gender, forestry and transport statistics.
 A biennial overview of key statistics for member countries.
 A set of wikis to support collaboration activities and disseminate information about good practices.

This activity has hence continued in the form of the Generations and Gender Programme.

Sustainable Energy Division 
The Sustainable Energy Division supports the UN's energy program, including security of energy supply, economics, and environmental protection, in the areas of energy efficiency, renewable energy, clean electricity, natural gas, coal, and resource classification. It is the secretariat responsible for Committee on Sustainable Energy and various expert groups supporting access to affordable and clean energy for all, as well as help reduce greenhouse gas emissions of the energy sector in the region.

The Expert Group on Resource Management created the United Nations Framework Classification for Resources, the first widely accepted natural resource management system for classifying, managing, and reporting energy, mineral, and raw material resources in the world.

United Smart Cities (USC) 

The United Smart Cities programme is a joint effort between UNECE and the Organization for International Economic Relations (OiER).

Numerous private business entities and other international and European agencies support the programme, including Environment Agency Austria (EAA), the Royal Institution of Chartered Surveyors (RICS), UN-Habitat, and the International Society of City and Regional Planners (ISOCARP). The programme promotes areas of strategic smart city policy and development. The key focus areas as detailed by the programme are:

 Urban mobility
 Sustainable housing
 Clean energy
 Waste management
 Information and Communications Technology (ICT)

Executive secretaries

Statistical Journal of the United Nations Economic Commission for Europe  

From 1982 to 2007 the IOS Press published the Statistical Journal of the United Nations Economic Commission for Europe  on behalf of the UNECE.

See also 
 European Union
 Council of Europe
 Marco Keiner
 OSCE
 Official statistics
 UNECE Population Activities Unit
 United Nations System
 United Nations Economic Commission for Latin America and the Caribbean (overlapping membership)
 United Nations Economic and Social Commission for Asia and the Pacific (overlapping membership)
 UNFC
 UN/CEFACT—Trade facilitation via standardised business communication.
 UN/LOCODE—location codes, maintained by UNECE
 International E-road network, numbered by UNECE
 World Forum for Harmonization of Vehicle Regulations
 Green card system—motor insurance scheme of UNECE
 International Union of Tenants (IUT)

References

External links

 UNECE Statistical Database
 UNECE Weekly
 UN Economic Commission for Europe
 EU and UNECE cooperation.
 UNECE vehicle regulations

 
United Nations Development Group
Economic Commission for Europe
Organizations established in 1947
Vehicle law
United Nations organizations based in Geneva